New Zealand at the 1982 Commonwealth Games was represented by a team of 112 competitors and 43 officials. Selection of the team for the Games in Brisbane, Australia, was the responsibility of the New Zealand Olympic and Commonwealth Games Association. New Zealand's flagbearer at the opening ceremony was veteran discus thrower Robin Tait. The New Zealand team finished fifth on the medal table, winning a total of 26 medals, five of which were gold.

New Zealand has competed in every games, starting with the British Empire Games in 1930 at Hamilton, Ontario.

Medal tables

New Zealand was fifth on the medal table in 1982, with a total of 26 medals, including five gold.

Competitors
The following table lists the number of New Zealand competitors participating at the Games according to gender and sport.

Archery

Athletics

Track and road

Field

Combined

Men's decathlon

Women's heptathlon

Badminton

Singles

Doubles

Teams

Boxing

Cycling

Road

Track
Men's 1000 m sprint

Men's 1 km time trial

Men's 4000 m pursuit

Men's 10 miles scratch race

Diving

Lawn bowls

Shooting

Pistol

Rifle

Shotgun

Swimming

Weightlifting

Wrestling

Officials

See also
New Zealand Olympic Committee 
New Zealand at the Commonwealth Games
New Zealand at the 1980 Summer Olympics
New Zealand at the 1984 Summer Olympics

External links
NZOC website on the 1982 games 
Commonwealth Games Federation website

1982
Nations at the 1982 Commonwealth Games
Commonwealth Games